Hajjiabad (also Romanized as Ḩājjīābād and Hājīābād) is a village in Sadeqiyeh Rural District, in the Central District of Najafabad County, Isfahan Province, Iran. At the 2006 census, its population was 2,449, in 686 families.

References 

Populated places in Najafabad County